North Carolina Highway 134 (NC 134) is a primary state highway in the U.S. state of North Carolina.  The  highway provides a more direct route between Troy and Asheboro, via I-73/I-74/US 220 or US 220 Bus.

Route description
NC 134 is a predominantly two-lane rural highway that begins in downtown Troy at the intersection of North Main Street and East Main Street.  Going north, it travels next to Denson Creek Golf Course before becoming the eastern edge of the Uwharrie National Forest. A couple of times the national forest goes over the eastern side of the road but not many. At Beane Country Road, the Uwharrie Forest finally goes west of the road as the road continues north.  At Dawson Miller Road, NC 134 ends, just  from the I-73/I-74/US 220 interchange.

History
NC 134 was established in 1966 as a new primary route along existing secondary roads; from NC 109 Bus, in Troy, to US 220, south of Ulah.  In 1974, it was extended south, overlapping with NC 109 Bus, to its current terminus with NC 24/NC 27/NC 109 Bus.

Junction list

References

External links

 NCRoads.com: N.C. 134

134
Transportation in Montgomery County, North Carolina
Transportation in Randolph County, North Carolina